John Regan is an American musician, songwriter, producer and bassist.  He is notable for being a member of ex-Kiss guitarist Ace Frehley's band Frehley's Comet from 1984 to 1990 and recorded and performed with Peter Frampton from 1979 to 2011. He has also recorded with John Waite, The Rolling Stones, Stephen Stills, Dave Edmunds, Robin Trower, Scandal, Billy Idol, David Bowie and David Lee Roth. He lives in Wappingers Falls, NY.

In the early 1990s, Regan was a Parks Commissioner for the Village of Wappingers Falls, New York. In 2006, Peter Frampton played outdoors in Wappingers Falls, New York with Regan for local residents.

, he co-hosts a Sunday morning radio show called Cafe Italia on 1450AM WKIP out of Poughkeepsie, NY. "We kicked around the possibility of a weekly radio program that focused on these timeless artists, their connection to Italian music and culture, and generally a show that would pay homage to the songs that are the "soundtrack" to many of our lives."

Regan is part of the band Four By Fate, which saw him reunite with former Frehley's Comet co-frontman Tod Howarth.

Partial discography

Bass

Dancing in the Street (1985) - Bowie & Jagger (Single version)
Dirty Work  (1986) ~ The Rolling Stones
Whiplash Smile (1986) - Billy Idol
Hide Your Heart (1988) - Bonnie Tyler
Not Fakin' It (1989) - Michael Monroe
Black Tie White Noise (1993) - David Bowie
Your Filthy Little Mouth (1994) - David Lee Roth

Ace Frehley

Frehley's Comet (1987) 
Second Sighting (1988) 
Live+1 (1988) 
Trouble Walkin' (1989) 
Greatest Hits Live (2006) 

Peter Frampton

Rise Up (1980) 
Breaking All the Rules (1981) 
Art of Control (1982) 
Frampton Comes Alive 2 - 1995

Richie Scarlet

The Catman & The Emperor (2020) 

ProductionBlue, Dressed in Black (2000) - Eric Stuart Band

Ace FrehleyTrouble Walkin' (1989)12 Picks (1997) Loaded Deck (1998) Greatest Hits Live (Ace Frehley album)'' (2006)

References

American rock bass guitarists
Year of birth missing (living people)
Living people
People from Wappingers Falls, New York
American male bass guitarists
Frehley's Comet members